Viktor Orsag (Hungarian: Ország Viktor, born 11 April 1975) is a retired  Serbian footballer who played as midfielder.

Career
Born in Vrbas, SR Serbia, back then still part of Yugoslavia, Orsag is Hungarian origin, after starting to play with AIK Bačka Topola, he played for several Serbian top league clubs as OFK Beograd, FK Spartak Subotica and FK Hajduk Kula.

External sources
 Profile at Srbijafudbal

Living people
1975 births
Footballers from Novi Sad
Serbian footballers
FK Vojvodina players
RFK Novi Sad 1921 players
OFK Beograd players
FK Spartak Subotica players
FK Hajduk Kula players
FK Crvenka players
FK TSC Bačka Topola players
FK Bačka 1901 players
Association football midfielders